Richland Township is one of the fifteen townships of Marion County, Ohio, United States.  The 2010 census found 1,635 people in the township.

Geography
Located in the southeastern part of the county, it borders the following townships:
Claridon Township - north
Canaan Township, Morrow County - northeast corner
Cardington Township, Morrow County - east
Westfield Township, Morrow County - southeast
Waldo Township - southwest
Pleasant Township - west
Marion Township - northwest corner

No municipalities are located in Richland Township.

Name and history
It is one of twelve Richland Townships statewide.

Government
The township is governed by a three-member board of trustees, who are elected in November of odd-numbered years to a four-year term beginning on the following January 1. Two are elected in the year after the presidential election and one is elected in the year before it. There is also an elected township fiscal officer, who serves a four-year term beginning on April 1 of the year after the election, which is held in November of the year before the presidential election. Vacancies in the fiscal officership or on the board of trustees are filled by the remaining trustees.

References

External links
County website

Townships in Marion County, Ohio
Townships in Ohio